Felice Tamburelli (died 1656) was a Roman Catholic prelate who served as Bishop of Sora (1638–1656).

Biography
On 1 March 1638, Felice Tamburelli was appointed during the papacy of Pope Urban VIII as Bishop of Sora.
On 14 March 1638, he was consecrated bishop by Francesco Maria Brancaccio, Cardinal-Priest of Santi XII Apostoli, with Biago Proto de Rubeis, Archbishop of Messina, and Giovanni Battista Altieri, Bishop Emeritus of Camerino, serving as co-consecrators. 
He served as Bishop of Sora until his death in 1656.

References

External links and additional sources
 (for Chronology of Bishops) 
 (for Chronology of Bishops) 

17th-century Italian Roman Catholic bishops
Bishops appointed by Pope Urban VIII
1656 deaths